The 2012 Beijing Hyundai International Youth Football Tournament was an under-19 age group competition that took place on 7-9 September 2012.

The competition was sponsored by Hyundai, a corporate sponsor of the China national football team.

Final table

Results

Under-20 association football